Staurozoa is a class of Medusozoa, jellyfishes and hydrozoans. It has one extant order: Stauromedusae (stalked jellyfishes) with a total of 50 known species. A fossil group called Conulariida has been proposed as a second order, although this is highly speculative. The extinct order is largely unknown and described as a possibly cnidarian clade of marine life with shell-like structures, the Conulariida. Staurozoans are small animals that live in marine environments, usually attached to seaweeds, rocks, or gravel. They have a large antitropical distribution, a majority found in boreal or polar, near-shore, and shallow waters. Few staurozoans are found in warmer tropical and subtropical water environments of the Atlantic, Indian, and Pacific Ocean basins, but most are known from the Northern Hemisphere. Over the years the number of discovered species has increased, with an estimated 50 species currently recognized. Information on Staurozoa is sparse, and it is one of the least studied groups within Cnidaria. While often neglected, correctly recognizing the characteristics of this class is crucial for understanding cnidarian evolution.

Morphology 
During the metamorphosis of a stauropolyp into an adult stauromedusa, is the eight primary tentacles: 

 Disappear by resorption.
 Metamorphose into adhesive interradial and perradial rhopalioids.
 Remain as primary tentacles but with a modified shape.
 Migrate and cluster together with the secondary tentacles.

Their life cycle is not well known, but is simplistic. They have a lifespan of less than a year and the planua larva attaches to the substrate, developing into a primary (interstitial) polyp that undergoes an apical transformation to develop into its adult body. The bodies consist of a calyx or cup, where they take in their prey with tentacles that contain cnidocysts- stinging cells. The tentacles are clusters on the edge of the body that lie on a stalk that attaches to a benthic substrate with their adhesive basal disk. The color of a Staurozoan depends on where they've attached in their environment.

Ecology 
Staurozoans are predators. Their diet includes crustaceans, with smaller Staurozoans consuming harpacticoid copepods and larger species consuming gammarid amphipods. They also eat chironomid fly larvae and plankton. After digestion, they eject the remains of their food from their bodies. They are also preyed upon by fish as well as mollusks.

Gallery

References

 
Medusozoa
Cnidarian taxonomy